Banjerd Singkaneti (born, 11 February 1964) is a Thai legal scholar, a lecturer of law at Thammasat University and a noted critic of Thai Prime Minister Thaksin Shinawatra.

Education and early career
Banjerd completed an LL.B. at Bangkok's Ramkhamhaeng University. He received an LL.M. in public law from Thammasat University, followed by a Magister Legum (LL.M.) Doktors der Rechte (Dr.jur.) from Ruhr-Universität Bochum in Germany. He returned to Thailand after completing his doctorate and now teaches administrative law and constitutional law at Thammasat University.

Criticism of Thaksin Shinawatra
Banjerd was a leader of the People's Alliance for Democracy, a  group active in 2006 which attempted to bring down the government of Prime Minister Thaksin Shinawatra.  He famously criticized Thaksin as being even worse than Nazi dictator Adolf Hitler.

The Embassy of Israel protested in a letter to the Bangkok Post, the English-language newspaper which published Banjerd's statement.

Assect Examination Committee
After a military coup overthrew the government of Thaksin in a coup, the junta appointed Banjerd to the Asset Exemination Committee to investigate allegations of corruption against Thaksin. He was also appointed to the Constitution Drafting Committee prepare a new constitution.

During the drafting process, Banjerd said in an interview:  I personally believe in social structure and administration through traditions and customs that we once had in small communities. It’s more real than western-style democracy because people rule by themselves. I firmly believe that we really need to look back into our village life.

References

Living people
Banjerd Singkaneti
Banjerd Singkaneti
Banjerd Singkaneti
Ruhr University Bochum alumni
Banjerd Singkaneti
Banjerd Singkaneti
Scholars of administrative law
Scholars of constitutional law
1964 births